No. 258 Squadron was a Royal Air Force squadron during the First and Second World Wars.

History

First World War
No. 258 Squadron was first formed 25 July 1918 from 523, 525 and 529 Special Duties Flights at Luce Bay near Stranraer, Scotland under the control of No. 25 Group RAF. It was equipped with De Havilland DH.6 biplanes and carried out anti-submarine patrols over the Irish Sea. It was disbanded on 5 March 1918.

World War II
The squadron was reformed on 20 November 1940 at RAF Leconfield, Yorkshire as a fighter squadron equipped with Hawker Hurricanes, commanded by Wilfred Clouston. First based at RAF Acklington they relocated to RAF Jurby, Isle of Man. By April 1941, No. 258 Squadron's time at Jurby had come to an end, and they transferred to RAF Valley and thence to RAF Kenley in preparation to take the offensive to the enemy. In October they were stood down to prepare for a move to the Far East. After a few days in Singapore, they were withdrawn to Sumatra and then Java, where they suffered many losses either killed or captured by the Japanese. The survivors transferred their aircraft to No. 605 Squadron and most attempted to escape by ship to Australia, but all the ships were sunk en route with no survivors.

The squadron was again reformed 1 March 1942 from G Squadron at Ratmalana Airport, near Colombo, Ceylon but suffered severe losses during the Japanese carrier strike on 5 April 1942. After a spell in Burma (under Neil Cameron) the squadron was withdrawn to be re-equipped with American Republic P-47 Thunderbolts. In June 1945 it then began training for the invasion of Malaya but on the Japanese surrender, the squadron was finally disbanded on 31 December 1945.

The squadron was largely manned by Royal New Zealand Air Force pilots.

See also
 List of Royal Air Force aircraft squadrons

References

Bibliography

External links
RAF History 258 Sqdn

258 squadron
Military of British Ceylon
Military units and formations of Ceylon in World War II
Military units and formations established in 1918
Military units and formations disestablished in 1918
Military units and formations established in 1940
Military units and formations disestablished in 1941
Military units and formations established in 1942
Military units and formations disestablished in 1945